The Gran Turismo World Series (also referred to as the GTWS) is a series of professional Gran Turismo world championship esports tournaments, managed directly by Japanese game development studio Polyphony Digital. The championship contains two series that are held concurrently throughout the year: the Nations Cup (entrants from their respective countries will represent them), the Manufacturer Series (entrants will race for and represent their chosen manufacturer). The series uses Polyphony Digital's latest racing video game Gran Turismo 7.

Through 2018 to 2021, the Gran Turismo World Series was previously sanctioned by the Fédération Internationale de l'Automobile. Polyphony Digital's partnership with the FIA is currently on hiatus.

The Nations Cup and Manufacturers Cup trophies are laser-scanned reproductions of Italian sculptor Umberto Boccioni's 1913 bronze futurist sculpture Unique Forms of Continuity in Space, chosen by Polyphony Digital as it represents the “surprise and fascination of machines first discovered by mankind”, and also shares values held by the Gran Turismo series. Players are given a plaque for their participation in the series during live events and by the end of the year. Players who finish in the Top 3 in any series receive a gold plaque and a trophy. Players were also formerly given a TAG Heuer watch, but no longer became a prize after their partnership with Polyphony ended in 2020; a set of Sony Alpha photography equipment were given out that year, followed by a set of BBS wheels for 2021.

Toyota, Genesis, Mazda, Michelin, Brembo, Sony Alpha, and BBS serve as the series partners of the World Series. The series is provided with clothing by Puma and peripherals by Thrustmaster. All virtual races in the tournament take place in specified locations all around the globe. In addition to the live studio audiences at the specified locations, the tournaments are streamed live in YouTube through several languages. The series has since made an impact in real-world motorsport, serving as a basis for virtual players in terms of possibly starting a career in esports before jumping into real-world motorsport.

History 
Polyphony Digital announced its partnership with governing body Fédération Internationale de l'Automobile in June 2014 to provide a more realistic racing experience in virtual motorsport. It permitted the Japanese studio to feature content certified by the FIA and launch an online championship in Gran Turismo 6 for the following year in 2015. It would be the earliest example of an official online championship managed by Polyphony Digital and sanctioned by the FIA. The following year in 2016, Polyphony and the FIA announced the formation of the FIA-Certified Gran Turismo Championships (FIA GTC).

The FIA GTC was established in Gran Turismo Sport shortly after the game's release. Many test seasons ran from 2017 to 2018, and the first official season commenced that year. The first World Tour was also held at Nürburgring, which saw Giorgio Mangano from Italy as the first Nations Cup event winner, and Philippe Nicolay, Matthew Thomas, and Anthony Duval, representing BMW as the first Manufacturer Series event winners. Former FIA Formula 3 Championship driver Igor Fraga became the inaugural Nations Cup champion in 2018, and Kanata Kawakami, Vincent Rigaud, and Tyrell Meadows also became the inaugural Manufacturer Series champions that year. As part of the FIA's involvement as a sanctioning body for the series, the champions were also honoured at the FIA Prize Giving Ceremony.

The format for the series changed in 2021 in response to the COVID-19 pandemic. All previously planned live events were dropped, and the season would instead be held online.

The series transferred over to Gran Turismo 7 for the 2022 season. Polyphony's partnership with the FIA was also put on hiatus that year, with FIA's Director of Innovative Sporting Projects, Frederic Bertrand, stating that they would resume the collaboration once Gran Turismo 7 becomes a sufficiently stable platform. As a result, the FIA name was dropped, and the tournament was renamed to the Gran Turismo World Series (GTWS). Two live events were reintroduced as part of the 2022 season, with the series returning to Hangar-7 in Salzburg, Austria for the Showdown and Monte-Carlo Sporting in Monte Carlo, Monaco for the World Finals.

The tournament has also hosted exhibition races since 2019. One of these exhibition races is known as 'Pro-Am', where competitors of the series would pair with various personalities, spanning from content creators, journalists, and professional racing drivers including former Formula One driver Juan Pablo Montoya and seven-time Formula One world champion Lewis Hamilton. Exhibition races have also been hosted by Sony's artificial intelligence department, Sony AI, where select series drivers race against their agent known as 'Gran Turismo Sophy', developed in collaboration by Sony AI, Sony Interactive Entertainment, and Polyphony Digital. This race is also used as a testing ground for Sony's AI team to evaluate Sophy's pace and behaviour on the race track.

Format

2018 season 
Before the "Online Series" is started, every season begins with a "World Tour" event, containing the top drivers from the season prior. The winner from the World Tour event gains direct access to the "World Final" event.

A phase dubbed as the "Online Series", which is essentially a qualification phase to decide the participants that will race in the live events of the championship tournament, kicks off every season. The Online Series is divided into four stages, with each stage hosting ten rounds. By the end of each stage, another World Tour event is hosted, which includes the top players from that stage instead of the top drivers from the previous season. The top players who are selected after the series must sign an application form in order to be able to participate for the World Tour events, and they must also be over 18. The Online Series goes on for five to seven months.

The "Live Events" begin after the Online Series. The Nations Cup category includes the top 90 players (30 per region) with the highest points across all four stages. Three different live events occur, with each live event carrying a specific world region. The top 10 players from those regions enter the "World Final" event, a championship stage to decide the number one player. The Manufacturer Series category includes the top 48 players (three players per region) and 16 manufacturers with the highest points across all four stages. The top players and manufacturers participate in the "World Final" event, to decide the top three players and the number one manufacturer. The winners of their respective series at the "World Final" are crowned either Nations Cup champion or Manufacturer Series champion.

2020 season

Format changes during COVID-19 pandemic 
Due to the COVID-19 pandemic, it was announced that the 2020 World Finals would be held as an online-based event.

Further format changes were made for 2021, where the online season (named World Series) was divided into six online races (replacing the physical World Tours), four of them containing one race for Nations Cup and Manufacturer Series, plus the mid-season "Showdown" playoff races and the grand finals, which were aired as tape delayed streams. The first two World Series races featured top competitors from the previous season (16 Nations Cup drivers and 12 Manufacturer Series players that chose the same manufacturer as with the previous season, with limit of one player per brand), after which they would race together against top players from the first half of the online qualifiers (the in-game races accessible to the general public) in the Showdown to determine who would advance to the next two stages. Players that advanced to the third and fourth round would then face opponents that qualified in the second half of the online qualifiers through the same criteria in the grand finals.

In other media 
World Series drivers including previous champions Fraga, Mikail Hizal, Takuma Miyazono, Tomoaki Yamanaka, Valerio Gallo, Coque López, and Daniel Solis appear in Gran Turismo 7 as AI opponents and License Test coaches.

Media coverage 
The World Series races are usually streamed live from Dock10 studios on YouTube and Twitch under the official Gran Turismo and PlayStation channels, and are available to watch through several languages.

Series champions 
There have been five different Nations Cup champions and eleven different individual Manufacturers Series champions since the series' foundation, in addition to four different winners in the Toyota GR GT Cup.

There are currently no multiple time Nations Cup champions, as each season has had a different champion each time. Igor Fraga from Brazil, along with Tomoaki Yamanaka and Takuma Miyazono from Japan, and Daniel Solis from the United States, hold the most individual Manufacturer Series titles with two each, Fraga and Yamanaka for Toyota, and Miyazono and Solis for Subaru. Fraga and Miyazono hold the most championship titles in total with four, each holding one Toyota GR GT Cup title, one Nations Cup title, and two individual Manufacturer Series titles. Miyazono also scored a treble in 2020 by winning the Toyota GR GT Cup and both GT World Series championships. Fraga is also the only participant to have won a championship in both the Gran Turismo World Series and real-world motorsport.

Igor Fraga, Mikail Hizal, Takuma Miyazono, and Coque López are the only winners who have won both the Nations Cup and Manufacturer Series championships.

Past competitions 
 Bold indicates world championship events.

References

External links 
 Official website

Fédération Internationale de l'Automobile
Gran Turismo (series) competitions